Events in the year 1663 in Norway.

Incumbents
Monarch: Frederick III

Events
Vardø witch trials:
27 February - Ellen Gundersdatter and Sigrid Jonsdatter were burned to death.
20 March - Sølvi Nilsdatter, Margrette Jonsdatter, and two more women were burned to death.
8 April - Barbra Olsdatter from Vadsø and four other women were burned to death, the last to be burned in the Vardø witch trials.

Arts and literature

Births

Deaths

20 March – Selius Marselis, tradesman (b. 1600)

20 April – Kjeld Stub, priest (b. 1607).

See also

References